The 1994 All-Ireland Senior Ladies' Football Championship Final was the 21st All-Ireland Final and the deciding match of the 1994 All-Ireland Senior Ladies' Football Championship, an inter-county ladies' Gaelic football tournament for the top teams in Ireland.

Waterford defeated Monaghan.

References

!
All-Ireland Senior Ladies' Football Championship Finals
Waterford county ladies' football team matches
Monaghan county ladies' football team matches